Neza e Sultan (Neza means spear; Sultan means King; literally Spear of Sultan) is located in Chagai District, Balochistan, Pakistan. Neza e Sultan is an extinct volcano, with only the magma chamber, which has been compared to a spear, remaining.

See also
List of volcanoes in Pakistan

External links
 Neza e Sultan

Volcanoes of Pakistan
Extinct volcanoes
Volcanic plugs of Asia
Landforms of Balochistan (Pakistan)
Rock formations of Pakistan